Christoph Daniel Kessler (born 28 April 1995) is a German middle-distance runner specialising in the 800 metres. He represented his country at two indoor and one outdoor European Championships.

In 2019, he won the bronze medal in the team event at the 2019 European Games held in Minsk, Belarus.

International competitions

Personal bests
Outdoor
800 metres – 1:45.27 (Pfungstadt 2022)
1000 metres – 2:18.92 (Leipzig 2021)
1500 metres – 3:36.63 (Karlsruhe 2022)
Mile – 4:01.72 (Lucerne 2020)
Indoor
800 metres – 1:47.14 (Karlsruhe 2021)
1500 metres – 3:38.46 (Dortmund 2022)

References

1995 births
Living people
German male middle-distance runners
Athletes (track and field) at the 2019 European Games
European Games medalists in athletics
European Games bronze medalists for Germany
Competitors at the 2017 Summer Universiade
People from Donaueschingen
Sportspeople from Freiburg (region)